Craig Schlattman (died December 9, 2014) was an American director, writer, producer, and cinematographer, best known for his Independent features, At Ground Zero starring Thomas Jane (credited as Tom Elliott), and The Seller starring Brian Brophy.

Career

Schlattman started his career in photography, shooting black-and-white photographs and printing mural size prints, and large-scale colour photographs of particular beauty with an interest in experimentation and movement. After exhibiting in numerous group and one-person shows, he was picked up by the Susan Spiritus Gallery in Newport, California with a body of work depicting pseudoscientific experiments full of humor, intelligence, and a sort of political whimsy.

Throughout his still photo career, Schlattman was producing [avant-garde], experimental films that were earning him a reputation in the art film world. The short subjects Slap and Bag, both funny, brutal, and formalist in context, won Directors Awards at the Sinking Creek Film Festival (now known as the Nashville Independent Film Festival), and travelled all over the world in many film programs and festivals, including a travelling show with Stan Brakhage, and Michael Snow, and screenings at the Museum of Modern Art. Schlattman called Submitting (produced by Rutger Hauer) "the worst film I've ever made", but it nonetheless went on to win a Silver award at the World Fest-Houston International Film Festival, a Bronze Award at the Athens International Film Festival, and a Certificate of Merit from the Chicago International Film Festival, which were the only festivals entered. Heroic and Furious, two hard to get documentaries about filmmaking behind the scenes of big Hollywood productions, have been shown at the Ann Arbor and Wiesbaden Film Festivals, and have the reputation of being very unconventional films in cinéma vérité or direct cinema style, which is not what the studios would like to have seen about their films, hence the problem in showing and purchasing them.

Very much a part of the resurgence of independent filmmaking in the early 1990s, Schlattman said that he waited a couple of years with a feature script he wanted to shoot before running into two actors he thought perfect for the part; Thomas Jane, and Aysha Hauer. Schlattman met them through a mutual acquaintance shooting something for a new director and thought they were perfect for the parts of Thomas Pennington and Aysha Almouth in his first feature, At Ground Zero. He picked for his subject marginal characters tied together by love and drugs in an extended traveling family on the road. At Ground Zero premiered at the Rotterdam International Film Festival to enthusiastic, full houses, and went on an extensive festival run in the US and Europe.

"An impressive debut. With dark, dead-pan humor, experimental visual techniques and solid performances, At Ground Zero is a promising first feature."  Jamie Painter - Film Threat.

"Powerful and distinctive. Impressive. ...a raw, edgy tale, shot through with dark humour Schlattman directs with terrific wit and immediacy. Well acted...winning portrayals."  Kevin Thomas - Los Angeles Times. 

"Life on the road with a couple of junkies doesn't get much more interesting than in this impressive first feature by Craig Schlattman. This is a small treasure of independent filmmaking."  Matt Langdon - LA Weekly.  

Schlattman said that he made mistakes along the way, let too much of the pressure put on him seep out to his actors. "Tom and Aysha are wonderful actors, and worked hard in difficult parts. I loved working with them and I'm sure they will go on to great things." After making the festival circuit, At Ground Zero had a small theatrical release and Schlattman started his second feature, The Seller.

A difficult story about marginal characters, The Seller opened at The Chicago Underground Film Festival to reviews of;

"An astonishing fusion of stark landscape cinematography and wildly compelling close-ups, especially of Brian Brophy as he delivers hypnotic monologues that seem to be about everything and nothing at once and that lay bare his character's internal processes without demystifying them. Schlattman rarefied emotion instead of breaking it down - his characters are indelible because they retain their mystery even as they let you inside."  Lisa Alspector - Chicago Reader.

and:

"The festival's most gratifying find could be The Seller which deserves a much larger audience. The meandering discussions they have about life, death, dreams and mortality have all the sizzle and wit you could ever hope to find in such a movie."  John Petrakis - Chicago Tribune. 

Unfortunately for audiences, the film had an unpublicized, un-marketed release and did not get "a much larger audience."

Undaunted, Schlattman proceeded to write "Guerrilla Filmmaking 101" articles and post them free on the internet (www.proletariatpictures.com) as a way to give back to filmmaking, and help other filmmakers to a successful completion of their Indie film. He said "I couldn't get past an agent on the freeway with my scripts - no big stunts, no nudity, just difficult compelling characters. Fat chance you get financing without Nick Cage signed on." He then went on to make Asymmetry, an extremely difficult film praised by those that have seen it, but ignored by the distributors.

Before illness occupied his time, Schlattman was seeking financing for a new film about family tragedy and insanity.  He was a 2008 recipient of the prestigious Bush Fellowship and was in pre-production on 2 new feature films at the time of his death.

Other work
Schlattman taught classes on filmmaking to college students for several years.

Filmography
Asymmetry
The Seller (1997)
At Ground Zero (1994)

Short Subjects
"Cap 86" (2009)

"Kauai Project"  (2010)

Red Lake Diaries (2008)
Heroic (1993)
Furious (1992)
Submitting (1989)
Boat (1987)
Evidence (1987)
Slap (1987)
Bag (1986)
Bike Film (1985)  
Honest (1979)
Title (1978)
3 (1977)
Edit (1977)
Fun House (1977)
ID (1977)
Synco (1977)
What? (1976)

External links
 
 Proletariat Pictures – official website

American film directors
American male screenwriters
American cinematographers
American film producers
Living people
Year of birth missing (living people)